Nizhyn is a city located in Chernihiv Oblast of northern Ukraine along the Oster River. Nizhyn serves as the administrative center of Nizhyn Raion. It hosts the administration of Nizhyn urban hromada which is one of the hromadas of Ukraine and was once a major city of the Chernigov Governorate. Nizhyn has a population of

History 
The earliest known references to the location go back to 1147, when it was briefly mentioned as Unenezh.

In the times of the Polish–Lithuanian Commonwealth, Nizhyn was granted Magdeburg rights (1625) as a self-governing town. In 1663 Nizhyn was the place of the Black Council of Ukrainian Cossacks, which elected Bryukhovetsky as the new Hetman of the Zaporizhian Host thus conditionally dividing Ukraine (Cossack Hetmanate) into left-bank Ukraine and right-bank Ukraine. It was also the seat of a major Cossack regiment (until 1782).

Nizhyn was once a major center of Hasidic Judaism and is the site of the Ohel (tomb) of the Hasidic master, Rabbi Dovber Schneuri of Chabad-Lubavitch. The city also housed the thriving Greek community, which enjoyed a number of privileges granted by Bohdan Khmelnytsky.

In the 19th century Nizhyn became an uyezd capital of the Chernihiv Governorate and the biggest city in the guberniya. In 1805, the Bezborodko Lyceum was established there (today — Nizhyn Gogol State University); its graduates include Nikolai Gogol whose statue graces one of city streets as well as Yevhen Hrebinka among other graduates. Nizhyn has also long been noted for its famous cucumbers.

During World War II, Nizhyn was occupied by the German Army from 13 September 1941 to 15 September 1943.

Jewish population
Jews first settled in Nizhyn at the beginning of the 19th century after the partition of Poland. The town grew to become a center for the Chabad Hasidim of Ukraine. Dovber Schneuri, the second Chabad rebbe, is buried here.  By 1847, 1,299 Jews had registered as residents. In 1897, 24% of the population, or 7,361 residents, were Jewish.

A wave of pogroms severely affected the Jewish population in 1881 and 1905. One group of emigrants settled in Philadelphia and founded the Neziner Congregation in 1896.

During their retreat from the Germans in the spring of 1918, the Red Army carried out additional pogroms. During World War II, the region was occupied by Germany, who murdered all Jews in the area. Only those who escaped survived.

In 1959, 1,400 Jews lived in Nizhyn, about 3% of the town's population. In 2005, Nizhyn population reached 80,000. Only about 300 Jewish families lived in the city.

Aircraft crash
In July 1969 two Tupolev Tu-22 aircraft from the nearby air base collided in mid-air. The crew ejected and the plane flew on unpiloted for 52 minutes, threatening the city of Nizhyn before crashing 0.5 km from the city's railway station.

Modern times
The city of Nizhyn is one of the ancient cities of Ukraine. The architectural complex of the city forms an expressive ensemble of an ancient trade city. The experts' estimates distinguish more than 300 ancient buildings, where 70 are of a great cultural and historical value. The expressive 200 years ensemble of Post Station (the only one preserved in Ukraine) deserves special mention. Nizhyn is a city of students (each fifth inhabitant of Nizhyn is a student). The following educational establishments operate in Nizhyn – State University named after Gogol; Agro-technical College, faculty of Kremenchyk Institute of Economy and New Technologies, College of Culture and Arts named after Zankovetska, Medical College, Nizhyn Professional Lyceum of Services, Nizhyn Agrarian Lyceum, vocational college, Lyceum at the University. There are four club institutions, the Drama Theater named after Kotsyubinskiy, the Choreographic school and park landscapes in the city.

The city boasts 38 libraries with the total fund of 17,365 thousand books, which caters for 44,429 readers, more than a dozen of museums, including Nizhyn Regional museum with the following sections: art, history, Nizhyn Post Station, with about 31 thousand of exhibits of the main fund, the Museum of the History of School No.3, the Museum of the History of School No.7 with a room of M.V.Nechkina, the Korolyov Museum in School No.14, the Glory Museum of Agrarian and Technical Institute, the Museum-Chemists shop named after M.Ligda. The following institutions function at Nizhyn State Pedagogical Institute named after Gogol: The Museum of Gogol, Art Gallery, the Museum “Rare book”, zoological museum, and botanical museum.
Nizhyn is a well-known industrial center, where 16 industrial enterprises, which belong to 8 branches, operate. Nizhyn is also an attractive tourist city. It is included into the tour “Necklace of Slavutych”.

A postage stamp featuring the coat of arms of Nizhyn was released by Ukraine in 2017.

Until 18 July 2020, Nizhyn was designated as a city of oblast significance and did not belong to Nizhyn Raion even though it was the center of the raion. As part of the administrative reform of Ukraine, which reduced the number of raions of Chernihiv Oblast to four, the city was merged into Nizhyn Raion.

Climate

Attractions 

Architecturally Nizhyn was shaped in the 18th century. Foremost among its buildings must be mentioned its seven Baroque churches: Annunciation Cathedral (1702–16, modernised 1814), Presentation Cathedral (1788), St. Michael's Church of the Greek community (1719–29), St John's Church (1752, illustrated, to the right), Saviour's Transfiguration Church (1757), Intercession Church (1765), and the so-called Cossack Cathedral of St. Nicholas (1658, restored 1980s), a rare survival from the days of Nizhyn's Cossack glory, noted for its octagonal vaults and drums crowned by archetypal pear-shaped domes. Other notable buildings include the Trinity Church (1733, rebuilt a century later), the Greek magistrate (1785), and the Neoclassical complex of the Nizhyn Lyceum (designed by Luigi Rusca, built in 1805–17, expanded in 1876–79).

Industry  

Modern Nizhyn is a major industrial center. The city has 16 companies and firms from eight industries:
 Engineering:
 NEC "Progress" – the production of photographic supplies, hunting scopes, medical equipment, household goods;
 JSC "Mechanical Plant" – manufacture of machinery for agriculture;
 Plant "Nezhinselmash" – poultry equipment, motorcycles, bicycles, spare parts, fittings for gas and vodogonov;
 Nezhinskoye Training and Production Enterprise "UTOS" – covers of metal for home canning, switches, electric sockets, nails, clips, extension cords.
 Food:
 Nezhinskii cannery – the leading state-owned enterprise for the production of canned vegetables;
 JSC "Nizhyn bread" – the production of bakery, confectionery and pasta;
 JSC "Nizhyn brewery" (stopped in the summer of 2008) – the production of beer;
 JSC "Nizhyn zhirkombinat" – manufacture and sale of varnishes, lacquers, oils, makukha.
 Medicine:
 LLC "Lab scanning devices" – the production of medical equipment, optical and electronic devices, rubber means;
 LLC RDC "Metecol" – the production of medical products using and training simulators.
  Light:
 JSC "DiSi Nezhinka" – design and manufacture of clothing;
 Dry:
 JSC "Nifar" – the production and supply of paints, detergents, toothpastes, plant protection products;
 Timber:
 Of "Furniture Factory"
PVKF ** "Courier";
 Building:
 JSC "Plant management of construction materials";
 "Printing":
 LLC "Aspect".

Gallery

Notable people

 Jacob Pavlovitch Adler, Jewish actor.
 Sonya Adler, one of the first women to perform in Yiddish theater in Imperial Russia.
 Antoni Andrzejowski, Polish botanist, teacher of the Nizhyn Lyceum  (1839-1856), author of the diary Wspomnienia starego detiuka.
 Abraham Berline, artist.
 Mark Bernes, a Soviet actor and singer of Jewish ancestry.
 Elina Bystritskaya, a Soviet film actress, People's Artist of the USSR.
 Semyon Desnitsky, a disciple of Adam Smith who introduced his ideas to the Russian public.
 Timofei Dokshizer, principal trumpeter and trumpet soloist of the Bolshoi Theater, of Jewish ancestry.
 Olga Khokhlova, Pablo Picasso's wife.
 Sergey Korolyov, the father of the Soviet space program.
 Nestor Kukolnik, a Russian playwright and prose writer.
 Yuri Lisyansky, headed the first Russian circumnavigation of the globe.
 Kateryna Pavlenko, lead singer of the Ukrainian electro-folk band Go_A.
 Zhanna Pintusevich-Block, a world champion sprinter.
 Israel Rosenberg, founded the first Yiddish theater troupe in Imperial Russia.
 Ihor Sholin, former professional Ukrainian football player.
 Maria Zankovetska, a Ukrainian theater actress, the very first recipient of People's Artist of Ukraine.

References

External links 
 
  "A city, glorious and tender, loved by all", in  Zerkalo Nedeli (the Mirror Weekly), July 2005. in Russian, in Ukrainian
  Nizhen/Nizhyn in the Encyclopedia of Ukraine
  History of Nizhyn
 History of Jewish Community in Nezhin
 The Official Site of Radomysl Castle 
 The murder of the Jews of Nizhyn during World War II, at Yad Vashem website.

 
Cities in Chernihiv Oblast
Nezhinsky Uyezd
Kiev Voivodeship
Cossack Hetmanate
Shtetls
Magdeburg rights
Cities of regional significance in Ukraine
Holocaust locations in Poland